212th Division or 212th Infantry Division may refer to:

 212th Infantry Division (Wehrmacht)
 212th Coastal Division (Italy)
 212th Division (People's Republic of China)
 212th Division (Imperial Japanese Army)